This list includes all ships known or thought to have been shipwrecked on the coast of what is now Australia up to 1699, including those that were refloated. All of them occurred on the west coast; that is, on the coast of what is now Western Australia.

List of 17th century shipwrecks in Australia

Notes
 Both the National Shipwreck Database and the Western Australian Shipwrecks Database list an unidentified ship that ran aground at Victoria Harbour on the south coast of Western Australia in 1627. According to the National Shipwreck Database, it was refloated. The Western Australian Shipwrecks Database lists as sources Heeres (1899) p. 51; The West Australian, 4 February 1937; The West Australian, 24 February 1937; and research notes of D. C. Cowan. The first of these appears to be in error, as Heeres makes no mention of a ship grounding on the south coast on that page.

References
 
 
 

Australia history-related lists
 
 Z
17th Century
17th century-related lists
17th-century
Australia transport-related lists
Maritime history of the Dutch East India Company